Hans Wichmann (28 January 1905 – 23 September 1981) was a German middle-distance runner. He competed in the men's 1500 metres at the 1928 Summer Olympics.

References

1905 births
1981 deaths
Athletes (track and field) at the 1928 Summer Olympics
German male middle-distance runners
Olympic athletes of Germany
Place of birth missing